Scaphyglottis prolifera is a species of orchid native to the Neotropics.

References

External links

prolifera

Orchids of Central America
Orchids of Belize